The Individual large hill event of the FIS Nordic World Ski Championships 2015 was held on 26 February 2015.
A qualification was held on 25 February 2015.

Results

Qualification
The qualification was started at 18:30.

Final
The first round was started at 17:00 and the second round at 18:09.

References

Individual large hill